Johannes Ernesaks (22 July 1876 Peningi Parish (now Raasiku Parish), Harrien County – 1952 Kirov, Russian SFSR) was an Estonian politician. He was a member of the Estonian Constituent Assembly, representing the Estonian Social Democratic Workers' Party.

References

1876 births
1952 deaths
People from Raasiku Parish
People from Kreis Harrien
Estonian Social Democratic Workers' Party politicians
Members of the Estonian Constituent Assembly